McGuireWoods LLP is a US-based international law firm. Their largest offices are in Richmond, Virginia, Charlotte, North Carolina and Chicago, Illinois.

History

1800s–1960s 
McGuireWoods traces its origins to two lawyers, Egbert R. Watson and Murray Mason McGuire. In 1834, Watson opened a law office in Charlottesville, VA. In 1870, he formed a partnership with his son-in-law, George Perkins in what would become Perkins, Battle & Minor.

In 1897, McGuire started practicing law in Richmond, VA. He was joined by John Stewart Bryan in 1898 and the two formed McGuire & Bryan. In the 1960s, the firm became McGuire, Woods, King, Davis & Patterson.

1966–2000 
In 1966, Charlottesville’s Battle, Neal, Harris, Minor & Williams merged with Richmond’s McGuire, Woods, King, Davis & Patterson to create McGuire, Woods & Battle. In 1987, the firm merged with Boothe, Prichard & Dudley to create McGuire, Woods, Battle & Boothe.

In 1991, McGuire, Woods, Battle & Boothe took over Cable, McDaniel, Bowie & Bond, a Baltimore law firm. After additional mergers, the firm changed its name to McGuireWoods in 2000.

In 1998, the firm established its affiliate McGuireWoods Consulting to provide consulting services in government and public relations.

2000–present 
In 2003, McGuireWoods merged with Chicago firm Ross and Hardies.  In 2006, McGuireWoods merged with Chicago-based Gordon & Glickson.

In 2008, the firm merged with Helms Mulliss & Wicker in North Carolina. In 2009, McGuireWoods opened a London office after a merger.

In 2014, McGuireWoods opened its Dallas office. In 2015, the firm entered into an alliance with FuJae Partners, a Shanghai-based law firm and opened a second office in Los Angeles. In 2016, the firm opened an office in San Francisco. As of 2019, the firm has 21 offices worldwide.

In December 2017, Richard Cullen stepped down as chairman of McGuireWoods and partner Jonathan Harmon became the firm’s new chairman. In 2019, Richard Davis was hired as the new chief operating officer.

McGuireWoods was named one of the most innovative law firms in North America by Financial Times in 2018 and 2019.

In June 2020, the Open Technology Fund (OTF) asked McGuireWoods, which had been advising it pro bono, for help in a conflict with the U.S. Agency for Global Media (USAGM) and its then-director Michael Pack. McGuireWoods advised it could not help in the case. OTF learned in December 2020 that the reason for the refusal was that McGuireWoods had decided to investigate OTF on behalf of USAGM and Pack instead. The Government Accountability Project, citing records obtained via the Freedom of Information Act, claimed McGuireWoods had billed USAGM $1.625 million at an average rate of $320 an hour after receiving a no-bid contract to investigate OTF as well as Voice of America employees.

Notable cases 
 In June 2017, Vice President Mike Pence retained Richard Cullen, then-chairman of McGuireWoods, as outside legal counsel related to the special counsel investigation into Russian efforts to interfere with the 2016 election.
 In May 2018, Elizabeth Hutson led the McGuireWoods team that represented human trafficking survivor Kendra Ross. Ross was awarded an almost $8 million judgment, the largest civil single-plaintiff human trafficking award in U.S. history, in the suit she brought against the nationwide regimented cult The Value Creators Inc. (formerly known as The United Nation of Islam).
 McGuireWoods attorneys including Richard Cullen represented Cynthia and Frederick Warmbier when they sued North Korea for having “brutally tortured and murdered” their son, Otto Warmbier. In December 2018, a federal court ordered North Korea to pay the Warmbiers over $500 million.
 In 2018, McGuireWoods attorney Matthew Fitzgerald represented Ryan Collins in the U.S. Supreme Court case Collins v. Virginia. The Court voted in favor of Collins, ruling that the automobile exception to the Fourth Amendment does not permit a police officer to enter the curtilage of a home without a warrant.
 McGuireWoods lawyers were part of the defense team hired to represent Boeing in a federal criminal investigation related to the 737 MAX aircraft. In January 2021, Boeing entered into a deferred prosecution agreement with the U.S. Department of Justice.
McGuireWoods represented mining company Asarco LLC in litigation related to the ongoing cleanup of a former lead and zinc smelting site in western Montana. In May 2021, U.S. District Judge Dana Christensen ruled that Atlantic Richfield Co. must pay Asarco $16 million and 25 percent of future sums to contribute to ongoing cleanup.

McGuireWoods Alums 

 George Allen
 Former U.S. Ambassador to Australia William C. Battle
Cheri Beasley
 U.S. District Judge Ken Bell, Western District of North Carolina
 John N. Dalton
 Frank Donatelli
 Timothy Flanigan
 Justice Leroy R. Hassell Sr.
Jack McLean, former mayor of Tallahassee
 Florida Supreme Court Justice Carlos Muñiz
 Robert H. Patterson Jr.
 Lewis F. Payne Jr.
 Judge Robert E. Payne
Jacob Rooksby
 Judge Richard Leroy Williams

Current McGuireWoods Lawyers and/or Consultants with McGuireWoods Consulting (MWC)
Richard Cullen
John Adams
Scott Becker (partner in the Healtchcare Department and founder and publisher of Becker's Hospital Review
George Terwilliger
Andrew G. McBride
Former Gov. Jim Hodges
Laura Fornash (MWC)
Preston Bryant (MWC)
William J. Howell (MWC)
Bernard L. McNamee, Former Commissioner of the Federal Energy Regulatory Commission

See also 

 List of 100 largest law firms globally

References

External links
 
 McGuireWoods Consulting website
 FuJae Partners website

Law firms established in 1834
Law firms based in Richmond, Virginia
1834 establishments in Virginia